Codeine 3-O-demethylase (codeine O-demethylase, CODM) is an enzyme with systematic name codeine,2-oxoglutarate:oxygen oxidoreductase (3-O-demethylating). This enzyme catalyses the following chemical reaction

 codeine + 2-oxoglutarate + O2  morphine + formaldehyde + succinate + CO2

Codeine 3-O-demethylase contains Fe2+.

References

External links 

EC 1.14.11